This article lists those who were potential candidates for the Democratic nomination for Vice President of the United States in the 1992 election. On June 2, 1992, Arkansas Governor Bill Clinton won the 1992 Democratic nomination for President of the United States, and became the presumptive nominee. On July 9, 1992, Tennessee Senator Albert Gore, Jr. was chosen as his running mate. 

Clinton considered roughly forty different candidates for vice president, including those who did not hold elective office, but Clinton ultimately chose Gore, a two-term Senator who had previously run for president in 1988. Former Deputy Secretary of State Warren Christopher led Clinton's vice presidential selection team. In making the selection, Clinton emphasized Gore's experience with foreign policy and environmental issues. Clinton's choice of a fellow young southern centrist defied conventional wisdom, but the choice of Gore was well-received, and Gore made an effective surrogate on the campaign trail. 

The Clinton–Gore ticket would go on to defeat the Republican ticket of incumbents Bush–Quayle and the Independent ticket of Perot–Stockdale in 1992, and the Republican ticket of Dole–Kemp and the Reform ticket of Perot–Choate in 1996. The Clinton-Gore duo became the youngest ticket in history to win a presidential election.

Selection

Final Six

Media speculation on possible vice presidential candidates

Members of Congress

Governors

Other Individuals

See also
Bill Clinton 1992 presidential campaign
1992 Democratic Party presidential primaries
1992 Democratic National Convention
1992 United States presidential election
List of United States major party presidential tickets

References

Bill Clinton
Vice presidency of the United States
Al Gore
Nancy Pelosi
1992 United States presidential election